The 2021 PDC Players Championship consisted of 30 darts tournaments on the 2021 PDC Pro Tour. Like with the second half of 2020, these event were grouped into Super Series events, with 8 events taking place throughout the year.

Prize money
The prize money for the Players Championship events remained at 2020 levels, with each event having a prize fund of £75,000.
This is how the prize money is divided:

February (Super Series 1)

Players Championship 1
Players Championship 1 was contested on Thursday 25 February 2021 at the Bolton Whites Hotel in Bolton.  hit a nine-dart finish against .

Players Championship 2
Players Championship 2 was contested on Friday 26 February 2021 at the Bolton Whites Hotel in Bolton.  hit a nine-dart finish against .

Players Championship 3
Players Championship 3 was contested on Saturday 27 February 2021 at the Bolton Whites Hotel in Bolton.  hit a nine-dart finish against .

Players Championship 4
Players Championship 4 was contested on Sunday 28 February 2021 at the Bolton Whites Hotel in Bolton.  hit a nine-dart finish against .

March (Super Series 2)

Players Championship 5
Players Championship 5 was contested on Tuesday 16 March 2021 at the Marshall Arena in Milton Keynes.  hit a nine-dart finish against , whilst  also did the same against .

Players Championship 6
Players Championship 6 was contested on Wednesday 17 March 2021 at the Marshall Arena in Milton Keynes.

Players Championship 7

Players Championship 8
Players Championship 8 was contested on Friday 19 March 2021 at the Marshall Arena in Milton Keynes.  hit a nine-dart finish against .

April (Super Series 3)

Players Championship 9
Players Championship 9 was contested on Saturday 24 April 2021 at the H+ Hotel in Niedernhausen.  hit a nine-dart finish against .

Players Championship 10
Players Championship 10 was contested on Sunday 25 April 2021 at the H+ Hotel in Niedernhausen.  and  hit nine-dart finishes against  and  respectively.

Players Championship 11
Players Championship 11 was contested on Monday 26 April 2021 at the H+ Hotel in Niedernhausen.

Players Championship 12
Players Championship 12 was contested on Tuesday 27 April 2021 at the H+ Hotel in Niedernhausen.  hit a nine-dart finish against .

June (Super Series 4)

Players Championship 13
Players Championship 13 was contested on Monday 14 June 2021 at the Marshall Arena in Milton Keynes.  hit a nine-dart finish against .

Players Championship 14
Players Championship 14 was contested on Tuesday 15 June 2021 at the Marshall Arena in Milton Keynes.  and  hit nine-dart finishes against  and  respectively.

Players Championship 15
Players Championship 15 was contested on Wednesday 16 June 2021 at the Marshall Arena in Milton Keynes.  hit a nine-dart finish against .

Players Championship 16
Players Championship 16 was contested on Thursday 17 June 2021 at the Marshall Arena in Milton Keynes.

July (Super Series 5)

Players Championship 17
Players Championship 17 was contested on Monday 5 July 2021 at the Coventry Building Society Arena in Coventry.

Players Championship 18
Players Championship 18 was contested on Tuesday 6 July 2021 at the Coventry Building Society Arena in Coventry.  and  hit nine-dart finishes against each other.

Players Championship 19
Players Championship 19 was contested on Wednesday 7 July 2021 at the Coventry Building Society Arena in Coventry.  hit a nine-dart finish against .

Players Championship 20
Players Championship 20 was contested on Thursday 8 July 2021 at the Coventry Building Society Arena in Coventry.  and  hit nine-dart finishes against  and  respectively.

August (Super Series 6)

Players Championship 21
Players Championship 21 was contested on Monday 2 August 2021 at the Barnsley Metrodome in Barnsley.

Players Championship 22
Players Championship 22 was contested on Tuesday 3 August 2021 at the Barnsley Metrodome in Barnsley.

Players Championship 23
Players Championship 23 was contested on Wednesday 4 August 2021 at the Barnsley Metrodome in Barnsley.

October (Super Series 7)

Players Championship 24
Players Championship 24 was contested on Tuesday 19 October 2021 at the Barnsley Metrodome in Barnsley.  and  hit nine-dart finishes against  and  respectively.

Players Championship 25
Players Championship 25 was contested on Wednesday 20 October 2021 at the Barnsley Metrodome in Barnsley.

Players Championship 26
Players Championship 26 was contested on Thursday 21 October 2021 at the Barnsley Metrodome in Barnsley.  hit a nine-dart finish against .

Players Championship 27
Players Championship 27 was contested on Friday 22 October 2021 at the Barnsley Metrodome in Barnsley.

November (Super Series 8)

Players Championship 28
Players Championship 28 was contested on Tuesday 2 November 2021 at the Barnsley Metrodome in Barnsley.  and  hit nine-dart finishes against  and  respectively.

Players Championship 29
Players Championship 29 was contested on Wednesday 3 November 2021 at the Barnsley Metrodome in Barnsley.  and  hit nine-dart finishes against  and  respectively.

Players Championship 30
Players Championship 30 was contested on Thursday 4 November 2021 at the Barnsley Metrodome in Barnsley.

References

2021 in darts
2021 PDC Pro Tour